Leonce Nadine Nyadjo Nguepmegne  (born November 18, 1985 in Bertoua) is a Cameroonian female volleyball player. She is a member of the Cameroon women's national volleyball team and played for Bafia Evolution in 2014. 

She was part of the Cameroonian national team at the 2014 FIVB Volleyball Women's World Championship in Italy.

Clubs
  Bafia Evolution (2014)

References

External links
https://www.237online.com/article-67258-le-cameroun-perd-son-3-egrave-me-match-face-agrave--la-serbie-3-0-agrave--la-coupe-du-monde-de-volleyball-2014.html
https://web.archive.org/web/20170824011347/http://www.cavb.org/pagescom.php?option=pagedetail&id=367
http://www.camer-sport.be/1275/7/CM/19/cameroun-volleyball--15-lionnes-sont-en-italie-pour-dafendre-les-couleurs-nationales-cameroon.html

1985 births
Living people
Cameroonian women's volleyball players
Setters (volleyball)
21st-century Cameroonian women